"Don't Lose the Magic" is a 1992 dance/house song recorded by American singer Shawn Christopher, which was co-written by Mike "Hitman" Wilson, Shawn's brother Gavin Christopher and Bill Dickens, and co-produced by Wilson with Neal Howard, Chris Cooke, George Hess and engineer Goh Hotoda. The single was the follow up to "Another Sleepless Night", as well as her second number-one single on the Billboard Hot Dance Club Play chart, reaching the top spot on March 28, 1992, for two weeks. On the Billboard Hot 100 chart, it peaked at number 71, while in the United Kingdom, it reached number 30 on the UK Singles Chart, her highest chart position there.  A 1999, remix of the song also hit the US Dance chart.

Critical reception
Larry Flick from Billboard commented, "The track, which has been remixed by Mike "Hitman" Wilson, David Morales, and Todd Terry, is a slammin', R&B flavored houser that frames Christopher's fine voice with spiraling strings and a warm bass line. Guaranteed to pack dancefloors". He also added that "the beats pump hard, the hook is undeniable, and Christopher proves that she is far from a one-hit wonder." A reviewer from Music & Media wrote, "The '70s disco magic is revived."

Track listings
 12 inch single (US)
A1: "Don't Lose the Magic" (Hitman's 12") - 7:13  
A2: "Don't Lose the Magic" (Dee Reprise) - 3:30  
B1: "Don't Lose the Magic" (Morales' 12") - 7:52  
B2: "Don't Lose the Magic" (Magic Todd Dub) - 5:45

 CD promo (US)
 "Don't Lose the Magic" (Hitman's 7") - 4:01  
 "Don't Lose the Magic" (Hitmans 12") - 7:13

Charts

1999 remix

References

External links
Music Video at YouTube

1992 songs
1992 singles
Arista Records singles
Songs written by Gavin Christopher
House music songs